The 2002 Southern Conference baseball tournament was held at Joseph P. Riley Jr. Park in Charleston, South Carolina, from May 22 through 25. Fourth seeded  won the tournament and earned the Southern Conference's automatic bid to the 2002 NCAA Division I baseball tournament. It was the Eagles third tournament win.

The tournament used a double-elimination format. Only the top eight teams participate, so East Tennessee State, Appalachian State and VMI were not in the field.

Seeding

Bracket

All-Tournament Team

References 

SoCon Tournament
Southern Conference Baseball Tournament
Southern Conference Baseball
Southern Conference baseball tournament